Rachel Anna Korine (née Simon) is an American former actress. Married to director Harmony Korine, she is best known for starring as Cotty in the 2013 crime film Spring Breakers and Betsy in Men Go to Battle (2015), Junia in The Knick (2014–2015).

Life and career
Korine was born and raised in Nashville, Tennessee. She has starred in the films Septien, as well as Mister Lonely, Trash Humpers, and Spring Breakers, the latter three of which were  written and directed by her husband, Harmony Korine. From 2014–2015, she played Junia on the Cinemax drama series The Knick.

Personal life
Rachel and Harmony Korine met in their hometown of Nashville, and wed in 2007. They share a daughter, Lefty Bell Korine, and a son, Hank.

Filmography

Film

Television

References

External links

 

American film actresses
American television actresses
Living people
Actresses from Nashville, Tennessee
21st-century American actresses
Year of birth missing (living people)